Walter Hazelden (born 13 February 1941; died 2019) was an English former footballer who played as an inside forward for Aston Villa and Wigan Athletic.

Career
Hazelden was born on 13 February 1941 in Ashton-in-Makerfield, Wigan. He started his career with Aston Villa after being signed as a junior player in 1956. At the age of 16, he made his first team debut for the club in November 1957 against West Bromwich Albion, scoring the opening goal and setting up Villa's second in a 3–2 defeat. On 1 February 1958, before a match against Blackpool, Hazelden presented a gift on behalf of Aston Villa to Stanley Matthews to commemorate his 43rd birthday. A few days later, he represented the England national youth team, scoring in a 2–2 draw against Yugoslavia. He scored five goals in 17 Football League games for Villa before joining Wigan Athletic in July 1960.

Hazelden played at Wigan for one season, making 26 appearances in the Lancashire Combination, and finishing as the club's top scorer with 23 goals.

He then joined Southern League side Rugby Town where he played for 3 seasons making 112 appearances in all competitions and scoring 56 goals

References

1941 births
2019 deaths
People from Ashton-in-Makerfield
English footballers
Association football forwards
Aston Villa F.C. players
English Football League players
Wigan Athletic F.C. players